Jonas Serge Martin (born 9 April 1990) is a French professional footballer who plays as a midfielder for Ligue 1 club Lille.

Club career

Montpellier
Born in Besançon, Martin was a Montpellier HSC youth graduate, In April 2011, he signed a new contract with the club until 2015. On 2 September 2011, he was loaned to Ligue 2 club Amiens SC for one year.

In May 2014, Martin extended his contract with Montpellier until 2017.

Betis
On 9 June 2016, Martin signed a three-year deal with La Liga side Real Betis.

Strasbourg
In 2017, Martin moved back to France, joining newly promoted RC Strasbourg.

Lille
In July 2022, Martin signed with Lille.

References

External links

Living people
1990 births
Sportspeople from Besançon
Association football midfielders
French footballers
Montpellier HSC players
Amiens SC players
RC Strasbourg Alsace players
Real Betis players
Stade Rennais F.C. players
Lille OSC players
Ligue 1 players
Ligue 2 players
La Liga players
France youth international footballers
French expatriate footballers
French expatriate sportspeople in Spain
Expatriate footballers in Spain
Footballers from Bourgogne-Franche-Comté